Greasby, Frankby and Irby (previously Caldy and Frankby, 1973 to 1979, and Royden, 1979 to 2004) is a Wirral Metropolitan Borough Council ward in the Wirral West Parliamentary constituency.

Councillors

References

Wards of Merseyside
Politics of the Metropolitan Borough of Wirral
Wards of the Metropolitan Borough of Wirral